Spillway Icefall is an icefall descending northward through central Duncan Mountains to Amundsen Coast on the coast of Antarctica.

The icefall cascades through the mountains giving the appearance of a turbulent spillway on a dam. 

The descriptive name was approved by Advisory Committee on Antarctic Names (US-ACAN) from a proposal by Edmund Stump, geologist, Arizona State University, who worked in this area, 1974–75.

Icefalls of the Ross Dependency
Amundsen Coast